This was the first edition of the tournament.

Romain Arneodo and Tristan-Samuel Weissborn won the title after defeating Dan Added and Théo Arribagé 6–4, 5–7, [10–5] in the final.

Seeds

Draw

References

External links
 Main draw

Vilnius Open - Doubles
2022 Doubles